Irving Eugene Foster (March 20, 1942) is a former professional American football running back in the American Football League for the San Diego Chargers. He also was a member of the Edmonton Eskimos and the Ottawa Rough Riders in the Canadian Football League. He played college football at Arizona State University.

Early years
Born in Salem, New Jersey, Foster grew up in Pennsville Township, New Jersey and attended Pennsville Memorial High School. He accepted a football scholarship from Arizona State University, where he played halfback along with wingback Larry Todd.

As a senior, he led the team with 311 rushing yards. He finished his college career with 741 rushing yards, 7 rushing touchdowns, 323 receiving yards and one receiving touchdown. He played in the North-South Shrine Game.

Professional career
Foster was selected by the San Diego Chargers in the 10th round (78th pick overall) of the 1965 AFL Draft. He was also selected by the Dallas Cowboys in the 15th round (201st overall) of the 1965 NFL Draft. As a rookie, he was a reserve fullback behind Keith Lincoln.

In 1966, he was named the starting fullback over Lincoln. In 1970, he appeared in 7 games (2 starts). He was waived on September 2, 1971.

On September 2, 1971, he was claimed off waivers by the Atlanta Falcons. He was released on September 13.

On September 20, 1971, he joined the Edmonton Eskimos of the Canadian Football League on a five-day tryout. In 1973, he missed most of the season after contracting pneumonia, which opened the door for Calvin Harrell to start at running back. 

On June 4, 1974, he was traded to the Ottawa Rough Riders in exchange for defensive back Willie McKelton. On August 9, he was placed on the 12-day injury reserve list. He was released on September 10.

References

1942 births
Living people
People from Pennsville Township, New Jersey
People from Salem, New Jersey
Players of American football from New Jersey
American football running backs
Arizona State Sun Devils football players
San Diego Chargers players
Edmonton Elks players
Ottawa Rough Riders players
American Football League players
Pennsville Memorial High School alumni